Devour may refer to:

 Devour (film), a 2005 film directed by David Winkler
 "Devour" (song), a 2008 single by Shinedown
 "Devour", a 2009 song by Marilyn Manson from The High End of Low
 "Devour", a 2002 song by Disturbed from Believe
 Devoured (film), a 2012 drama horror thriller film directed by Greg Olliver, starring Marta Milans, Kara Jackson, Bruno Gunn
 Devour (Dave Hause album), 2013
 Devour (Pharmakon album), 2019
 Motorola Devour, an Android-based smartphone produced by Motorola for Verizon Wireless
 A brand of frozen food products produced by Heinz
 Devoured (novel), a novel by Anna Mackmin, that was shortlisted for the Desmond Elliott Prize
 Devour! The Food Film Fest, a Canadian film festival